I Heard is a 1933 Pre-Code Fleischer Studios animated short film starring Betty Boop, and featuring Koko the Clown and Bimbo. The cartoon features music by and a special guest appearance from jazz musician Don Redman and his Orchestra.

Plot
Workers from the Never Mine wash up before eating lunch at Betty Boop's Tavern, where Betty sings and dances while they dine.  After lunch is over, the miners all return to work (and reapply their dirt and grime before entering the mine).  An excited Bimbo runs around, singing "I Heard", and calls Betty to come down into the mine.  She takes the dumbwaiter down, but the cable snaps and plunges to the bottom.  The crash leaves her unhurt, but clad only in her lingerie (Bimbo obligingly returns her dress).  The two discover a team of ghosts playing a game of baseball, with a cartoon bomb as the ball.  Bimbo and Betty head to the surface in the elevator, unwittingly carrying the bomb with them.  They send it back down, and the resultant explosion fills all the railroad cars with coal.  The ghosts are also blown into the air, and land in graves opened by a laughing Bimbo.

Notes and comments
Songs in this short include the title track, "How'm I Doin'?", and "I Know a Girl Named Betty Boop," all sung by Don Redman and Mae Questel.
This short was the last appearance of Bimbo.

References

External links
Watch I Heard (uncensored) in fully restored HD at Laugh Bureau Vintage
I Heard on YouTube
I Heard at the Big Cartoon Database

1933 films
Betty Boop cartoons
Animated musical films
American musical films
1930s American animated films
American black-and-white films
1933 animated films
Paramount Pictures short films
Fleischer Studios short films
Short films directed by Dave Fleischer